Rohani binti Ibrahim is a Malaysian politician and served as Deputy of Kelantan State Executive Councillor.

Election Results

References

Living people
People from Kelantan
Malaysian people of Malay descent
Malaysian Muslims
Malaysian Islamic Party politicians
Members of the Kelantan State Legislative Assembly
Kelantan state executive councillors
21st-century Malaysian politicians
Year of birth missing (living people)